The ultramarine grosbeak (Cyanoloxia brissonii) is a species of grosbeak in the family Cardinalidae. It is found in a wide range of semi-open habitats in eastern and central South America, with a disjunct population in northern South America.

Description
These birds are 15 cm long. The adult male exhibits a dark-blue plumage with bright-blue upper-wings. The females and the juveniles are brown.

The ultramarine grosbeak is territorial; it doesn't fly in flocks. If a male invades the territory of another, for sure there will be a conflict with some violence.

Distribution and habitat
They inhabit the edge of swamps, secondary forests and plantations.
The native range of these birds extends from Northeast and central Brazil, Bolivia, Paraguay to Argentina. The also can be found northern Venezuela and Colombia. There are some morphological differences between subspecies from different regions.

Behaviour and ecology

Breeding
It takes place between September and February, builds its nest not far from the ground and each clutch usually has between 2 and 3 eggs. The chicks are born between 13 and 15 days after the eggs are laid.

Feeding
Feeds on seeds, fruits and insects.

References

 BirdLife International 2012. "Cyanocompsa brissonii". IUCN Red List of Threatened Species. Version 2012.1. International Union for Conservation of Nature. 
 Hilty, S. 2003. Birds of Venezuela. Christopher Helm. Londres.

Further reading

ultramarine grosbeak
Birds of South America
Birds of the Venezuelan Coastal Range
ultramarine grosbeak
Taxonomy articles created by Polbot